Benjamin James Barnett (born 18 December 1969) is an English former professional footballer who played in the Football League as a forward.

References

1969 births
Living people
English footballers
Association football forwards
Heybridge Swifts F.C. players
Leyton F.C. players
Boreham Wood F.C. players
Barnet F.C. players
Dagenham & Redbridge F.C. players
English Football League players
Footballers from Islington (district)
Essex Senior Football League players